Seyyed Ali (also Romanized as Seyyed ‘Alī, Şeyd‘alī, and Şeyd ‘Alī) is a village in Nurali Rural District, in the Central District of Delfan County, Lorestan Province, Iran. At the 2006 census, its population was 214, in 50 families.

References 

Towns and villages in Delfan County